The Nikon Z 9 is a full-frame mirrorless camera produced by Nikon. The camera was announced on October 28, 2021.

The Z 9 has the same 45.7 MP resolution as the Z 7 and Z 7II cameras, but uses a much faster stacked CMOS sensor which improves autofocus and continuous shooting performance. The continuous shooting capabilities of the Z 9 significantly exceed those of Nikon's previous Nikon D6 while providing more than double the resolution. The Z 9 is the first Nikon Z camera to support 8K video, which can be recorded internally at 60 fps in 12-bit N-RAW.

The Z 9 is the first flagship full-frame camera without a mechanical shutter.

The Z 9 won Camera Grand Prix 2022 Camera of the Year and Readers Award.

Features 

 "Synchro VR" where both in-body and in-lens image stabilization can  stabilize the same axes.
 Burst lengths of over 1000 shots (previous Nikon cameras were limited to at most 200 shots per burst).
 Internal 10-bit video recording in H.264, H.265 and ProRes 422 HQ (also supports HLG and Nikon N-Log).
 Internal 12-bit raw video recording using ProRes RAW HQ (up to 4.1K at 60 fps) and Nikon proprietary N-RAW (up to 8.3K at 60 fps).
 Video recording length limit extended from 30 minutes to 2 hours and 5 minutes.
 Dedicated "sensor shield" to protect the sensor from dust and dirt when the camera is off or the lens taken off.
 VR lock to reduce sensor shock during standby.
 10-pin remote and flash sync connectors.
 Built-in GPS, GLONASS and QZSS receiver for geotagging.
 Allows switching between linear and non-linear focus throw in manual focus with some lenses.
 "Dual-Stream Technology" providing separate paths for capturing images and updating the viewfinder, which eliminates viewfinder blackout and reduces viewfinder lag.

Gallery

Update history

References 

Z 9
Z 9
Cameras introduced in 2020
Full-frame mirrorless interchangeable lens cameras